Giacomo Di Segni (30 November 1919 – 7 March 1986) was an Italian boxer. He competed at the 1948 Summer Olympics and the 1952 Summer Olympics.

References

1919 births
1986 deaths
Italian male boxers
Olympic boxers of Italy
Boxers at the 1948 Summer Olympics
Boxers at the 1952 Summer Olympics
Boxers from Rome
Mediterranean Games gold medalists for Italy
Mediterranean Games medalists in boxing
Boxers at the 1951 Mediterranean Games
Light-heavyweight boxers
20th-century Italian people